Sara Wright (born 21 March 1969) is a Bermudian sailor. She competed in the Europe event at the 2000 Summer Olympics.

References

External links
 

1969 births
Living people
Bermudian female sailors (sport)
Olympic sailors of Bermuda
Sailors at the 2000 Summer Olympics – Europe
Place of birth missing (living people)